Edward B. Jarvis (sometimes known as E.B. Jarvis) was a British film editor who worked on over fifty productions during his career including Meet Me at Dawn (1947). He spent much of his career working for ABPC at Elstree Studios.

Selected filmography
 Children of Chance (1930)
 Love Lies (1931)
 Children of Fortune (1931)
 The Pride of the Force (1933)
 Letting in the Sunshine (1933)
 No Funny Business (1933)
 What Happened Then? (1934)
 Drake of England (1935)
 No Monkey Business (1935)
 Southern Roses (1936)
 Paradise for Two (1937)
 Murder in Soho (1939)
 Under Your Hat (1940)
 The House of the Arrow (1940)
 South American George (1941)
 Jeannie (1941)
 The Ghost of St. Michael's (1941)
 Escape to Danger (1943)
 Meet Me at Dawn (1947)
 This Was a Woman (1948)
 The Hasty Heart (1949)
 Stage Fright (1950)
 Murder Without Crime (1950)
 The Woman's Angle (1952)
 Girls at Sea (1958)
 Operation Bullshine (1959)
 Partners in Crime (1961)

References

Bibliography
 Capua, Michelangelo. Anatole Litvak: The Life and Films. McFarland, 2015.

External links

Year of birth unknown
Year of death unknown
British film editors